Malaysian New Zealanders are New Zealand citizens and residents who are of Malaysian descent or Malaysian-born immigrants. As of 2018, approximately 17,464 Malaysian-born people lived in New Zealand, with a much higher number of New Zealanders with Malaysian ancestry.

History 
During the British colonial period, 42 people born in 1916 on the Straits Settlements (of which is now called Malaysia and Singapore) became the first residents of New Zealand. Most of them were the ethnic Malays and Chinese.

Emerging racial riots in Malaysia in 1969 prompted more students from the ethnic Chinese community to seek an education in New Zealand. Following the riots, the Malaysian Government introduced affirmative action policies to help the Bumiputera (mainly the Malays and indigenous people) to achieve a higher economic quality of life than the Chinese. Preferential university entry for the Bumiputera made it more difficult for ethnic Chinese to enter Malaysian institutions of higher learning making it preferable for Malaysian Chinese to move and study in New Zealand universities rather than in their own country.

In 1986, there were 3,480 Malaysians in New Zealand which later increased to 14,547 in 2006. Of this total, only 3,540 were Malays while most were Malaysian Chinese.

See also 

 Islam in New Zealand
 Malaysia–New Zealand relations
 Military history of New Zealand in Malaysia

References 

Asian New Zealander
 
Immigration to New Zealand
New Zealander